"Already Over" is the sixth and final single by the American Christian rock band Red on their debut full-length studio album End of Silence. The song was written by Rob Graves, Jasen Rauch and Jason McArthur. The song was released on February 8, 2008 for radio airplay and review. The song appears on WOW Hits 2009.

Track listing

Charts

Certifications

References

Red (American band) songs
2006 songs
Essential Records (Christian) singles
Songs written by Jasen Rauch
Songs written by Rob Graves
Songs written by Jason McArthur